Kopit is a surname. Notable people with the surname include:

Arthur Kopit (1937–2021), American playwright
Meredith Levien (née Kopit, born 1971), American media executive